The Burundian Permanent Representative to the United Nations in New York is the official representative of the Government of Burundi to the Headquarters of the United Nations.

List of representatives

See also 
List of current permanent representatives to the United Nations
United Nations Operation in Burundi

References 

 
United States
Burundi